Philiris satis is a species of butterfly of the family Lycaenidae. It is found on Goodenough Island in the Solomon Sea.

References

Butterflies described in 1963
Luciini